

See also

 Paleontology in Florida

References

 

Florida
Stratigraphic units
Stratigraphy of Florida
Florida geography-related lists
United States geology-related lists